Xiao Cuijuan (born 19 April 1986 in Fuzhou) is a Chinese powerlifter. She won the bronze medal at the women's 55 kg event at the 2016 Summer Paralympics, with 115 kilograms. She won the silver medal in the same event at the 2020 Summer Paralympics in Tokyo.

She won the bronze medal in the women's 52 kg event in 2012, the gold medal in the women's 44 kg event in 2008 and the bronze medal in the same event in 2004.

References

External links 
 

1986 births
Living people
Chinese powerlifters
Female powerlifters
Paralympic powerlifters of China
Paralympic gold medalists for China
Paralympic silver medalists for China
Paralympic bronze medalists for China
Paralympic medalists in powerlifting
Powerlifters at the 2004 Summer Paralympics
Powerlifters at the 2008 Summer Paralympics
Powerlifters at the 2016 Summer Paralympics
Powerlifters at the 2020 Summer Paralympics
Medalists at the 2004 Summer Paralympics
Medalists at the 2008 Summer Paralympics
Medalists at the 2012 Summer Paralympics
Medalists at the 2016 Summer Paralympics
Medalists at the 2020 Summer Paralympics
Sportspeople from Fuzhou
21st-century Chinese women